In the theory of stochastic processes in discrete time, a part of the mathematical theory of probability, the Doob decomposition theorem gives a unique decomposition of every adapted and integrable stochastic process as the sum of a martingale and a predictable process (or "drift") starting at zero. The theorem was proved by and is named for Joseph L. Doob.

The analogous theorem in the continuous-time case is the Doob–Meyer decomposition theorem.

Statement
Then there exist a martingale  and an integrable  predictable process  starting with   such that  for every .
Here predictable means that  is -measurable for every .
This decomposition is almost surely unique.

Remark
The theorem is valid word by word also for stochastic processes  taking values in the -dimensional Euclidean space  or the complex vector space . This follows from the one-dimensional version by considering the components individually.

Proof

Existence 
 

and

The martingale property

    a.s.

also follows from the above definition, for every }.

Uniqueness 
To prove uniqueness, let  be an additional decomposition. Then the process  is a martingale, implying that

    a.s.,

and also predictable, implying that

    a.s.

for any }. Since  by the convention about the starting point of the predictable processes, this implies iteratively that  almost surely for all , hence the decomposition is almost surely unique.

Corollary
A real-valued stochastic process  is a submartingale if and only if it has a Doob decomposition into a martingale  and an integrable predictable process  that is almost surely increasing. It is a supermartingale, if and only if  is almost surely decreasing.

Proof
If  is a submartingale, then

    a.s.

The equivalence for supermartingales is proved similarly.

Example
Let  be a sequence in independent, integrable, real-valued random variables. They are adapted to the filtration generated by the sequence, i.e.   for all .

and

If the random variables of the original sequence  have mean zero, this simplifies to

    and    

hence both processes are (possibly time-inhomogeneous) random walks. If the sequence  consists of symmetric random variables taking the values  and , then  is bounded, but the martingale  and the predictable process  are unbounded simple random walks (and not uniformly integrable), and Doob's optional stopping theorem might not be applicable to the martingale  unless the stopping time has a finite expectation.

Application
In mathematical finance, the Doob decomposition theorem can be used to determine the largest optimal exercise time of an American option. Let  denote the non-negative, discounted payoffs of an American option in a -period financial market model, adapted to a filtration , and let  denote an equivalent martingale measure. The Snell envelope is the smallest -supermartingale dominating  and in a complete financial market it represents the minimal amount of capital necessary to hedge the American option up to maturity. Then the largest stopping time to exercise the American option in an optimal way is

Since  is predictable, the event } is in  for every }, hence  is indeed a stopping time.

Generalization
The Doob decomposition theorem can be generalized from probability spaces to σ-finite measure spaces.

Citations

References

Theorems regarding stochastic processes
Martingale theory
Articles containing proofs